The Royal Sea Bathing Hospital in Margate, Kent was founded in 1791 by Dr John Coakley Lettsom, a Quaker physician and philanthropist, for the treatment of scrofula.

The hospital was one of the earliest—if not the earliest—specialist orthopaedic hospital in the UK, and pioneered the use of open-air treatment for patients with non-pulmonary tuberculosis. Patients received a variety of treatments, with a central focus on providing patients with the supposed clinical benefits of sunshine, fresh air and sea bathing.

History 
The organisation was founded in 1791 to treat poor suffers from scrofula in London. The original hospital was built between 1793 and 1796. The treatment was based on fresh air and bathing so from the start it was provided with verandas. Bathing was done from a bathing machine in the sea. At first the hospital was only opened during the summer months but in 1858 an indoor pool was added to allow bathing year round. When possible beds were on the verandah and patients slept there. Only in inclement weather were the beds brought indoors. The enlargement included the Knowles ward, a heated indoor salt-water pool and the hospital's chapel. The knowles ward had a flat roof that was used as a promenade by patients.

The hospital continued treating tuberculosis until the 1950s.  Better living conditions, preventative medicine and more modern treatments led to the hospital ceasing to treat TB patients in the early 1950s.  The whole complex has been turned into apartments.

Architecture 

The original building was of yellow brick with stone dressings.  The original block remains, but heavily altered, and is the basis of the eastern arm of the quadrangle.  In 1816 the southern wing was added and in 1820 the northern two storey wing.  Around 1853 the buildings were raised to two stories and a monumental Greek portico added to the front of the original building.  At the end of these wings were the wards for children.  The Knowles extensions of 1880 completed the square forming an internal quadrangle.  The entrance portico was now internal, so was moved to the south wing to form the current main entrance.

Associated buildings 
There are two other buildings and a statue within the complex considered notable enough to warrant listing by the statutory body, Historic England.

Chapel 
The chapel was built 1882–3 by James Knowles as part of Wilson's expansion.  It is now a grade II listed building.  It is of red brick with contrasting detailing and stone dressings on the buttresses.  In plan there is a nave of six bays, a single bay chancel and an apsidal east end.  The west end has a five light window.  There is a small tower to the north west and a porch to the south.

The stained glass is by Clayton and Bell and according to English Heritage "a very fine series ... depicting miracles and healing plants".  At the west end there is an octagonal font  and a wall painting depicting Naaman with his chariot and horse at the door of Elisha.  Underneath is Elisha's instruction to "Go wash in Jordan seven times and thy flesh will come again".  The organ is by Henry Willis ("Father" Willis) and has stencilled pipes to the front.

Mortuary 
The mortuary is from the 1880 expansion and is probably by James Knowles.  It is a single story red brick building with stone dressings and parapet.  The entrance has an ogee hood moulding in stone with a lancet window above.

Statue of Erasmus Wilson 
Erasmus Wilson was the donor who paid for the chapel and the 1883 extensions.  He is depicted in an academic gown.  The statue is in bronze mounted on a granite plinth forming the centrepiece of the hospital's front garden.

Footnotes

References

Citations 
 
 
 
 
 

Hospitals in Kent
Margate